Drama in the Futurists' Cabaret No. 13 is a 1914 Russian silent film directed by either Vladimir Kasyanov or Mikhail Larionov. It is probably the world's first avant-garde film.

Plot 
The plot of the movie is unknown, despite the fact that this film is only partially lost: just a few frames have survived.

Cast 

 Vsevolod Maksimovich in the lead role
 David Burliuk
 Vladimir Burliuk
 Natalia Goncharova
 Mikhail Larionov
 Vladimir Mayakovsky

References

External links 

1914 films
1910s Russian-language films
Russian silent films
Russian black-and-white films
Lost Russian films
Films of the Russian Empire
1914 lost films